The Battle of Irish Bend, also known as Nerson's Woods or Franklin, was a battle in the American Civil War. It was fought between Union Major General Nathaniel Prentice Banks against Confederate Major General Richard Taylor during Banks's operations against the Bayou Teche region near Franklin, the seat of St. Mary Parish in southern Louisiana.

Prelude
While the other two Union XIX Corps divisions under Nathaniel Prentice Banks were comprising the expedition into west Louisiana crossed Berwick Bay towards Fort Bisland, Brigadier General Cuvier Grover’s division went up the Atchafalaya River into Grand Lake, where they could either block a Confederate retreat, or force a retreat if the Confederates stayed and fought at Fort Bisland. The battle occurred two days after the Battle of Fort Bisland.

Battle

On the morning of April 13, 1863, Grover's division landed in the vicinity of Franklin and scattered Confederate troops attempting to stop them from disembarking. That night Grover ordered the division to cross Bayou Teche and prepare for an attack towards Franklin, Louisiana, at dawn. Meanwhile, however, Major General Richard Taylor reacted, feeling the obvious threat to his rear. He started withdrawing his forces from Fort Bisland, and his advance guard arrived quickly. On the morning of April 14, Taylor and his men were at Nerson's Woods, around a mile and a half above Franklin. As Grover's lead brigade marched out a few miles, it found Taylor's men on its right and skirmishing began. The fighting became intense; the Confederates attacked, forcing the Federal soldiers to fall back. The gunboat Diana arrived and anchored the Confederate right flank on the Teche. Still, Grover's men outnumbered the Confederates and when he paused to deploy his full force, Taylor withdrew rather than risk a pitched battle against superior numbers. Grover's men had taken the strategic position they sought. This victory, along with the one at Fort Bisland, two days earlier, assured the success of the expedition into west Louisiana.

Opposing Forces

Union
Army of the Gulf—Major General Nathaniel P. Banks

19th Corps — Major General Nathaniel P. Banks
 4th Division—Brig. Gen. Cuvier Grover
 1st Brigade—Brig. Gen. William Dwight
 1st Louisiana Infantry Regiment
 22nd Maine Infantry Regiment
 6th New York Infantry Regiment (Wilson's Zouaves)
 91st New York Infantry Regiment
 131st New York Infantry Regiment (1st Regiment, Metropolitan Guard)
 2nd Brigade—Col. William K. Kimball
 24th Connecticut Infantry Regiment
 12th Maine Infantry Regiment
 41st Massachusetts Infantry Regiment
 52nd Massachusetts Infantry Regiment
 3rd Brigade—Col. Henry Birge
 13th Connecticut Infantry Regiment
 25th Connecticut Infantry Regiment
 26th Maine Infantry Regiment
 159th New York Infantry Regiment
 Divisional Artillery—Col. James W. McMillan
 L Battery, 1st United States Artillery Regiment
 C Battery, 2nd United States Artillery Regiment
 2nd Massachusetts Light Artillery Battery

Confederate
District of West Louisiana - Major General Richard Taylor
 Mouton's Brigade - Brig. Gen. Jean Jacques Alfred Alexander Mouton
 18th Louisiana Infantry Regiment - Colonel Armand
 28th Louisiana Infantry Regiment - Colonel Henry Gray
 24th Louisiana Infantry Regiment (Crescent Regiment) - Colonel Bosworth
 10th Louisiana Infantry Battalion (Yellow Jacket Battalion) - Lieutenant Colonel Fournet
 12th Louisiana Infantry Battalion (Clack's Battalion / Confederate Guard Response Battalion)
 Pelican Battery - Captain Faries
 Cornay's Battery - Lieutenant Gordy
 Semmes' Battery - Lieutenant Barnes
 Sibley's Brigade - Brig. Gen. Henry Hopkins Sibley
 4th Texas Cavalry Regiment - Colonel James Reily
 5th Texas Cavalry Regiment - Colonel Thomas Green
 7th Texas Cavalry Regiment - Colonel Arthur P. Bagby Jr.
 13th Texas Cavalry Battalion (Waller's Battalion)
 Valverde Battery - Captain Sayer
 Unattached
 2nd Louisiana Cavalry Regiment - Colonel William G. Vincent

References

External links
 CWSAC Report Update—Louisiana

Sources

 Ayres, Thomas., Dark and Bloody Ground : The Battle of Mansfield and the Forgotten Civil War in Louisiana, Cooper Square Press, 2001.
 Parrish, T. Michael,  Richard Taylor, Soldier Prince of Dixie, University of North Carolina Press, 1992.
 Taylor, Richard, Destruction and Reconstruction : Personal experiences of the late war, Time-Life Books, 1983.
 Winters, John D., The Civil War in Louisiana, Baton Rouge: Louisiana State University Press, 1963, 
 National Park Service battle description

Irish Bend
Irish Bend
Irish Bend
Irish Bend
St. Mary Parish, Louisiana
1863 in Louisiana
April 1863 events